Sunbus Townsville was the principal bus operator in Townsville, Queensland, Australia, operating services under the Translink (Queensland) scheme in Regional Queensland. It is one of Sunbus' operations.  As of 2022 Sunbus has changed its name as part of a business re-brand by the parent company, Kinetic. Sunbus has now been dissolved into the Kinetic brand with its fleet of buses reflecting this change.

History
In April 1996, Harry Blundred, the proprietor of Thames Transit in the United Kingdom, began operating the route services in Cairns.

As part of the deal, Sunbus was also responsible for the operation of school bus services in the region, but these were sold in 1997 to another British bus operator, Stagecoach.

In April 2008, Blundred sold Marlin Coast Sunbus along with the other Sunbus operations to Transit Australia Group. In April 2010, the operation expanded with the acquisition of Hermit Park Bus Service.

In April 2019, Transit Australia Group was purchased by AATS Group, the parent company of Skybus and majority-owned by OPTrust. In August 2019, AATS Group was rebranded the Kinetic Group.

In late 2022, Sunbus was officially branded as KINETIC with all new advertising now showing the Kinetic Brand. All new buses will display the Kinetic logo with the current fleet of Sunbus slowly being updated to reflect the new brand name. The current website for Sunbus will stay active until early 2023 before it will be deactivated, directing customers to the new Kinetic website.

Service Area
Sunbus operated from Pallarenda in the north, Kelso and Stuart in the south and Kirwan and Thuringowa Central in the west. The area with the largest service coverage is the suburbs of Annandale and Douglas.

Fleet
In June 2013, the fleet consisted of 87 buses. The fleet livery is light blue.

See also
QConnect

References

Bus companies of Queensland
Kinetic Group companies
Transport companies established in 1995
Transport in Townsville
1995 establishments in Australia